The Legislative Assembly of Chelyabinsk Oblast is the regional parliament of Chelyabinsk Oblast, a federal subject of Russia. A total of 60 deputies are elected for five-year terms.

Elections

2020

References

Chelyabinsk Oblast
Politics of Chelyabinsk Oblast